The Sultanate of Harar was a Muslim state centered in present-day Harar, Ethiopia. It succeeded the Adal Sultanate. In this period the Harar Sultanate led by Amīr Nūr continued to carry on the struggle of the Adal leader Imām Aḥmed Gurēy against the Ethiopian Empire. Due to the encroaching Oromo people invading from the south, and Somali threats in north east blocking Harar's coastal influence, the Sultanate of Harar was ultimately a short lived state, lasting only 18 years (though if you start from the reign of Imām Aḥmed Gurēy, a more respectable 51 years).  The capital was moved east to the oasis of Aussa by Imām Maḥamed "Jāsa" Ibrahim who founded the Imamate of Awsa.

History

Establishment 
After the death of Ahmad ibn Ibrahim al-Ghazi, his nephew Nur ibn Mujahid proclaimed himself Amir or Sultan of Harar. Nur had to repair a damaged kingdom so spent the majority of his region upgrading Harar's defences and created the great wall of Harar. Nur ibn Mujhad inherited a war, he quickly married the widow of Ahmed Gragn Bati del Wambara. who helped him become come confident, and mentored him in his battles against the Ethiopian Empire.

Abyssinian conflict 
After the death of Garad Abbas, Gelawdewos invaded all of the Muslim provinces and kingdoms except for Harar. Among the kingdoms he conquered were Dawaro, Fatagar, Bali, and Hadiya. Gelawdewos focused on the southwestern side of Ethiopia (Kaffa), and there Nur ibn Mujahid found an opportunity for jihad. In order to weaken the Ethiopian emperor he invaded Bale and Dawaro. He set his eyes to invade Fetegar next, but the Ethiopian Govorner Fanu’el stopped This in 1550. But the war didn’t end there. Ras Fanu’el campaigned further into Muslim territory and pushed the Harari Army back to Adal. The Ethiopian Govorner raided Muslim territories and took many goods. Nur took a lot of damage in his first campaign, it took him nine years to recover, in 1559 he assembled a army of 1800 horsemen and 500 riflemen and numerous swords- and bowmen, this time he was successful and invaded Fetegar. Gelawdewos saw Nur as a threat so he sent Hamalmal Governor of Kambata and Ras Fasil to destroy Harar. What he did not know was that Nur was campaigning in Kaffa. The two Governors sacked Harar. after finding out that Nur had marched to Fetegar. Gelawdewos had had enough and led his imperial force to Nech ser in Fetegar. The two armies met on 23 March 1559 at the Battle of Fatagar, and it is said that a Harari rifleman shot the Abyssinian monarch, but he resisted in the midst of the battle  a group of Harari cavalry again attacked him and the monarch was struck and killed. Nur then sent the Abyssinian monarch's head to land of Sa'ad ad-Din II.

Nur's struggle for power 
After Nur's campaign in Fatager the Oromo under Gada Michelle Ambushed Nur.  Nur's opponent crushed him and he suffered a heavy loss.  Oromo tribes managed to sack Harar and overcrowded the city, which brought typhus to the city, which led to death of Nur.

Isman Al Habashi 1567–1569 
Isman al-Habashi was an Ethiopian slave of Harar and rose to power however he spent most of his reign at conflict with the descendants of Garad Abun Adashe

House of Adashe (Sultanate of Hubat) 1517–1571 
The uprising occurred in 1517 when the Harla emit of Hubat expanded his borders to the modern Sultanate of Adal which was ruled by Abu Bakr ibn Muhammad it is said that Garad Abun was killed near Harar which marked the end of the Somali influence in Hubat. Abun had 2 sons Wazir ibn Abun and Garad Abass ibn Abun, Abass achieved a greater status then Wazir, and invaded the Muslim provinces of Wej, Fatager, Bali, Dawaro whilst Wazir spent his life fighting local Harari warlords and kings of Hararghe. Wazir was succeeded by his son Talha Abass which managed to Invade the entirety of Harar (other cities included), and resumed his grandfathers conquest. However the descendants of Isman Al Habashi rebelled and killed Talha, and so the Habashi dynasty took control of the sacred city of Harar.

Fall of Harar 
In 1572, the sultan of Harar was executed by the emperor of Ethiopia, and the Oromo raided Harar meaning that Harar was left with no leader, and was at the brink of collapse.

Rulers

See also
Emirate of Harar
Isaaq Sultanate

References

1526 establishments in Ethiopia
1577 disestablishments in Ethiopia
16th century in Ethiopia
Early Modern history of Somalia
Former sultanates in the medieval Horn of Africa
Somali empires